Salcido is a Spanish surname. Notable people with the surname include:

 Brian Salcido (born 1985), American ice hockey player
 Carlos Salcido, Mexican footballer
 Gregory Salcido, American politician
 Ramon Salcido, American mass murderer

Spanish-language surnames